Mia Nihta Mono (English: Only one night) is an album  by Antonis Remos from 2001 which "sold double platinum". It is a live album.

Its tracks are all titled in Greek,

With The Door Opened—Me Tin Porta Anichti
—Pali Ap' Tin Archi
Με την πόρτα ανοιχτή		
Πάλι απ' την αρχή		
Μόνος μου		
Τα μεταξωτά σου χέρια		
Εγώ γεννήθηκα αετός		
Που να πήγε τόση αγάπη		
Μη ζητάς συγνώμη (Taj Mahal)		
Τι ήμουν για σένα		
Νύχτες μοναξιά		
Μην απορείς	
Ποιο κορμί σε ταξιδεύει	
Μείνε	
Έχω ανοίξει τα φτερά μου		
Το φως που πέφτει	 	 
Και θα τα πιω	 	 
Πάει-πάει	 	 
Ο ξενύχτης	 	 
Άκου τ'αηδόνια	 	 
Που πας χωρίς αγάπη	 	 
Ξημερώματα	 	 
Σταλιά σταλιά	 	 
Ξημερώματα στη στράτα	 	 
1000 Περιστέρια

CD number two:

Απόψε
Να 'χα τη δύναμη
Μ 'ανάστησες καρδιά μου
Μια καρδιά για σένανε
Μη γυρίζεις πια
Λέει λέει λέει
Ποιο κορμί σε ταξιδεύει - Ποιος να συγκριθεί μαζί σου
Φιλαράκι
Ζήτα μου ότι θες
Ρίτα Ριτάκι
Εφήμερες αγάπες
Έτσι ξαφνικά
Δεν θα ξαναρθείς

References

2001 albums
Antonis Remos albums